Three into One is the first compilation album from the band Ultravox, released in June 1980 in the UK. The album is a compilation of songs from their first three albums, Ultravox!, Ha!-Ha!-Ha! and Systems of Romance, and therefore concentrates on the earlier incarnation of the band from the 1970s featuring John Foxx, as opposed to the more recognisable 1980s line-up which featured Midge Ure.

The vinyl version and CD version of the song "Quiet Men" are different. The version on vinyl comes from the single and has an abrupt end, while the CD version is longer and fades out at the end.

Track listing
"Young Savage" – 2:59
"ROckWrok" – 3:35 
"Dangerous Rhythm" – 4:16
"The Man Who Dies Everyday" – 4:12
"The Wild, the Beautiful and the Damned" – 5:54
"Slow Motion" – 3:27
"Just for a Moment" – 3:08
"Quiet Men" – 4:07
"My Sex" – 3:04
"Hiroshima Mon Amour" – 5:11

Tracks 1, 3, and 4 written by Cann/Cross/Currie/Foxx/Shears.
Track 2 written by Foxx.
Tracks 5, 8, 9, and 10 written by Cross/Currie/Foxx.
Track 6 written by Cann/Cross/Currie/Foxx/Simon.
Track 7 written by Currie/Foxx

Personnel
Ultravox
Warren Cann - drums and vocals
Chris Cross - bass and vocals
Billy Currie - violin and keyboards
John Foxx - vocals
Stevie Shears - guitar (on tracks 1, 2, 3, 4, 5, 9, and 10)
Robin Simon - guitar (on tracks 6, 7, and 8)

Additional personnel
Terry Barham - assistant engineer

References

External links
Official Ultravox! site
Universal Music
The Disc Kiosk

Albums produced by Brian Eno
Albums produced by Steve Lillywhite
Albums produced by Conny Plank
1979 compilation albums
Ultravox compilation albums
Island Records compilation albums